Chlormequat is an organic compound with the formula  that is used as a plant growth regulator.  It is typically sold as the chloride salt, chlormequat chloride (C5H13Cl2N), a colorless hygroscopic crystalline substance that is soluble in water and ethanol.  It is an alkylating agent and a quaternary ammonium salt. Chlormequat is one of the onium-type growth regulators.

Chlormequat has been called the "most important inhibitor of gibberellin biosynthesis."  As such, it inhibits cell elongation, resulting in thicker stalks, which are sturdier, facilitating harvesting of cereal crops. It can also be used as an adjuvant for herbicides by retarding their oxidative disposal by plants. This is due to cytochrome P450-inhibition.

Regulation and toxicity
In the United States, chlormequat is classified as a low risk plant growth regulator and it is registered for use on ornamental plants grown in greenhouses, nurseries, and shadehouses.  It is not approved for use on crops intended for animal or human consumption.

The  (rat, oral) is low, approximately 670 mg/kg.

Exposure to high levels of chlormequat has been linked to developmental toxicity in animal models. It also affects reproduction in mammals.

It is classified as an extremely hazardous substance in the United States as defined in Section 302 of the U.S. Emergency Planning and Community Right-to-Know Act (42 U.S.C. 11002), and is subject to strict reporting requirements by facilities which produce, store, or use it in significant quantities.

References

External links

Quaternary ammonium compounds
Organochlorides
Plant growth regulators
Cations